Gordon is a rural locality in the local government areas of Kingborough and Huon Valley in the Hobart and South-east regions of Tasmania. The 2016 census has a population of 199 for the state suburb of Gordon.

History
Gordon was gazetted as a locality in 1967. It is believed that the locality was named for General Charles George Gordon.

Geography
The D'Entrecasteaux Channel forms the southern and eastern boundaries.

Road infrastructure
The B68 route (Channel Highway) enters from the south-west and follows the coast to the north-east, where it exits.

References

Localities of Kingborough Council
Towns in Tasmania
Localities of Huon Valley Council